Jorge Isaac Baltazar Ferreira (born November 3, 1982, in Mexico City) is a professional male squash player who represented Mexico. He reached a career-high world ranking of World No. 46 in December 2008.

References

External links 
 
 

1982 births
Living people
Mexican male squash players
Pan American Games bronze medalists for Mexico
Pan American Games medalists in squash
Squash players at the 2003 Pan American Games
Squash players at the 2007 Pan American Games
Sportspeople from Mexico City
Medalists at the 2003 Pan American Games
Medalists at the 2007 Pan American Games
21st-century Mexican people